Mordellistena majuscula is a species of beetle in the genus Mordellistena of the family Mordellidae, which is part of the superfamily Tenebrionoidea. It was discovered in 1977 and is endemic to Italy.

References

Beetles described in 1977
majuscula
Endemic fauna of Italy
Beetles of Europe